The House of Koháry was the name of an ancient and wealthy Hungarian noble family<ref>Reuben Percy, The Mirror of literature, amusement, and instruction, Volume 34, J. Limbird, 1839 </ref> with seats at Csábrág and Szitnya (now Čabraď and Sitno Castle) and the palace of Szentantal (now Svätý Anton, Slovakia).

History

Origin
The origin of the family is in Zala County in Hungary. In 1470, a "Georg Koháry" is mentioned in the court of King Matthias I Corvinus. The first notable member of the family was Peter Koháry (1564–1629), who was rewarded as the Baron of Csábrág by Emperor Ferdinand II and became commander of the fortress of Érsekújvár. His son Stephan I Koháry (1616–1664) fought against the Turks and died in the battle of Levenz.

Counts and generals
In 1685, Stephan II Koháry (1649–1731) became the first count in his family. He fought against the Ottoman Empire and the Kuruc. After his death, his fortune went to his nephew Andreas Koháry (1694–1757). All Kohárys had been officers and generals of the Habsburg emperors. 

Princely title
On 15 November 1815, the head of the house, Ferenc József Koháry (1760–1826), who served as the Hungarian Chancellor, was given the title of Fürst von Koháry (Prince of Koháry)"Vienna Cathedral Archive" by Emperor Francis I of Austria.

House of Saxe-Coburg and Gotha-Koháry
Upon the death of Ferenc József, his only surviving child, a daughter named Mária Antónia (1797–1862), was proclaimed "heiress of the name" (fíúsított).  When she married in 1816 (January 2), her husband Prince Ferdinand of Saxe-Coburg and Gotha took the name Saxe-Coburg and Gotha-Koháry. Among the descendants of Mária Antónia and Ferdinand are the last emperor of Austria (Charles I), the last four kings of Portugal (Pedro V, Luís I, Carlos I, Manuel II), and the last three tsars of Bulgaria (Ferdinand I, Boris III, Simeon II).

Notable members of the family
István Koháry (1649–1731)
Ferenc József Koháry, Fürst von Koháry de Csábrág et Szitnya'' (1767–1826)
Maria Antonia Koháry (1797–1862)

Koháry palaces
The Kohárys belonged among the magnates of Hungary. Their holdings were calculated to be around 150,000 hectares, making Princess Maria Antonia Koháry one the richest heiresses in Europe at the time of her marriage to Prince Ferdinand of Saxe-Coburg and Gotha.

See also
List of titled noble families in the Kingdom of Hungary

References

External links 
 

 
Austrian noble families

House of Saxe-Coburg and Gotha (Bulgaria)